...But the Little Girls Understand is the second studio album by power pop/new wave group the Knack, released by Capitol Records in February 1980. The album reached the number 15 spot on the Billboard 200 album chart in 1980. The singles "Baby Talks Dirty" and "Can't Put a Price on Love" charted on the Billboard Hot 100 at No. 38 and No. 62, respectively.  The song "Mr. Handleman" was released as a single in some countries, such as New Zealand. Guitarist Berton Averre has stated that "Mr. Handleman" was the first song he and lead singer Doug Fieger wrote together.  The RIAA certified the album as Gold on April 14, 1980.

Overview 
The album's title is a reference to blues musician Willie Dixon's song "Back Door Man", which has the lyrics: "I'm a back door man. The men don't know, but the little girls understand." Recording was done at MCA-Whitney Studios in Glendale, where Mike Chapman—credited as "Commander" Chapman—produced the album. Chapman also wrote a comedic description of the album in the liner notes, including the line "The songs are an assortment of feelings expressed redundantly as only the Knack can. This record is very dear to me and my bank manager." Band members Berton Averre and Doug Fieger wrote all of the songs except for "The Hard Way" which was written by Ray Davies and recorded by the Kinks on their album Schoolboys in Disgrace (1975).

Reception 
The album was a commercial disappointment, failing to match the immense commercial success of the band's 1979 debut Get the Knack. The album did, however, sell well enough to hit the No. 15 spot on the Billboard 200 album chart in 1980, propelled by the singles "Baby Talks Dirty" and "Can't Put a Price on Love" which both charted on the Billboard Hot 100 at No. 38 and No. 62, respectively. The RIAA certified the album as Gold on April 14, 1980, about two months after its release. Capitol Records released an expanded version of the album with bonus tracks in 2002.

Critic Dave Marsh of Rolling Stone, known for his utter disdain for most artists of the era, wrote a scathing review, commenting:

Specifically addressing some of the songs on the album, Marsh wrote "In Fieger's lyrics, women are literally commodities whose chief purpose is to be brutalized. The kid in 'Baby Talks Dirty' is a foul-mouthed windup doll, and in 'Mr. Handleman,' the tame calypso that's the new LP's catchiest number, the protagonist is pimping for his wife–a situation the group views with dispassion, if not outright approbation."  He further wrote "All of Fieger's lyrics finally boil down to one sentiment: f*ck- me, honey. (When he's feeling ambitious, he writes something like 'Can't Put a Price on Love,' which translates: f*ck me for free, babe.)"

Trouser Press remarked that the band "replicated the sound" of their debut album, and described "Baby Talks Dirty" as "anemic" and an "inferior replicant of 'My Sharona' (minus the thunderous hook)."  Trouser Press also remarked on the bad taste of some of the album's lyrics, giving "Mr. Handleman's" wife-pimping lyrics as an example.  In a generally negative review, Robert Christgau stated that "little girls prefer catchy, punchy second-hand songs to varied, indecisive thirdhand ones. In fact, so do critics."  On the other hand, critic Chris Woodstra of AllMusic has retrospectively given a positive opinion. He called the album "a good time for those who don't take rock & roll too seriously." Critic Steve "Spaz" Schnee of AllMusic has also stated that ...But the Little Girls Understand is "unfairly dismissed as an inferior rehash of the debut."

The album's front cover features Sharona Alperin, girlfriend of Doug Fieger, the young woman who had inspired the band's hit "My Sharona".

Track listing

Original release 
All songs are by Doug Fieger unless noted:
 "Baby Talks Dirty"  (Berton Averre, Doug Fieger)
 "I Want Ya"
 "Tell Me You're Mine"
 "Mr. Handleman"  (Berton Averre, Doug Fieger)	
 "Can't Put a Price on Love"  (Berton Averre, Doug Fieger)
 "Hold on Tight and Don't Let Go"
 "The Hard Way"  (Ray Davies)
 "It's You"  (Berton Averre, Doug Fieger)
 "End of the Game"
 "The Feeling I Get"
 "(Havin' a) Rave Up"  (Berton Averre, Doug Fieger)
 "How Can Love Hurt So Much"

Chart positions

Album

Personnel
Doug Fieger – lead vocals, rhythm guitar
Berton Averre – lead guitar
Prescott Niles – bass
Bruce Gary – drums

References

External links 
 ...But the Little Girls Understand at Rhapsody.com
 The Knack website

1980 albums
Albums produced by Mike Chapman
The Knack albums
Capitol Records albums